Trepe Station is a railway station serving the Vīpe Parish in the Latgale region of Latvia. It is located on the Riga–Daugavpils Railway.

References 

Railway stations in Latvia
Railway stations opened in 1861